Mein Hari Piya is a Pakistani Urdu language soap opera, which airs on Hum TV. It stars Soniya Hussain and Agha Ali in lead. The theme music was sung by Sara Raza Khan. It was also aired in India on Zee Zindagi.

At annual Hum Awards, it received nominations of Best Soap Actor and Best Soap Actress.

Cast
 Agha Ali as Zawar
 Soniya Hussain as Parisa
 Javeria
 Zeba Ali
 Syed Jibran
 Munawer Saeed
 Ayesha Toor
 Anum Fayyaz
 Fazila Qazi
 Mohsin Gilani
 Yasir Shooro
 Farah Nadeem
 Faisal Jameel
 Javeria

Soundtrack

The theme song, Mein Hari Piya, was composed and sung by Sanam Marvi.

References

2013 Pakistani television series debuts
Pakistani drama television series
Urdu-language television shows
Hum TV original programming